The 1972 Nobel Prize in Literature was awarded to the German author Heinrich Böll (1917–1985) "for his writing which through its combination of a broad perspective on his time and a sensitive skill in characterization has contributed to a renewal of German literature." Böll is the fifth German author to be recipient of the prize.

Laureate

The events of World War II had a significant influence on Heinrich Böll's literature. In his debut novel Der Zug war pünktlich ("The Train Was on Time", 1949) and the short story collection Wanderer, kommst du nach Spa... ("Stranger, Bear Word to the Spartans We...", 1950), he illustrated the folly of war and the pain it causes. Böll published a number of books that critiqued West German society after World War II, such as Gruppenbild mit Dame ("Group Portrait with Lady", 1971). Among his best-known works include Und sagte kein einziges Wort ("And Never Said a Word", 1953), Ansichten eines Clowns ("The Clowns", 1963), and Die verlorene Ehre der Katharina Blum ("The Lost Honour of Katharina Blum", 1974).

Deliberations

Nominations
In 1972, the Swedish Academy received nominations for 100 individuals. Böll started earning nominations for the Nobel Prize in Literature since 1960. In total, he received 29 nominations with the highest number in 1972 which eventually led to his awarding.

Twenty-seven authors were newly nominated such as Philip Roth, Norman Mailer, Bernard Malamud, Nadine Gordimer (awarded in 1991), V. S. Naipaul (awarded in 2001), Francis Stuart, Doris Lessing (awarded in 2007), Alan Paton, Astrid Lindgren, Anthony Burgess, and Sri Chinmoy. The most number of nominations was for the British-American poet W. H. Auden with 10 nominations. The oldest nominee was Compton Mackenzie (aged 89) and the youngest was Philip Roth (aged 39). The Polish-born American poet Jacob Glatstein and Indian novelist Tarasankar Bandyopadhyay were nominated posthumously by Moshe Starkman (1906–1975) and the Academy's Nobel Committee respectively. Five of the nominees were women namely Nadine Gordimer, Doris Lessing, Astrid Lindgren, Anna Seghers, and Marie Under.

The authors Natalie Clifford Barney, John Berryman, Victor Bridges, Fredric Brown, Américo Castro, Michał Choromański, Richard Church, Cecil Day-Lewis, R. F. Delderfield, Jacques Deval, Robert Faesi, Abraham Joshua Heschel, Ernestine Hill, Helen Hoyt, Vera Inber, Norah Lange, Violette Leduc, Laurence Manning, José Nucete Sardi, Kenneth Patchen, Betty Smith, Edgar Snow, Violet Trefusis, Mark Van Doren, and Ivan Yefremov died in 1972 without having been nominated for the prize.

Prize decision
Heinrich Böll had been considered for the prize by the Nobel committee since the first time he was nominated in 1960. The publication of Gruppenbild mit Dame in 1971, a year when Böll was not nominated for the prize, is believed to have strengthened his candidacy, and in 1972 the Nobel committee proposed that Böll should be awarded the prize. The other final candidates were Günter Grass, Eugenio Montale and Patrick White. A shared prize between Böll and Grass was proposed but rejected by the committee.

Nobel lecture
Böll delivered a Nobel lecture entitled An Essay on the Reason of Poetry on May 2, 1973 at the Swedish Academy. In his lecture, he said:

Notes

References

External links
Award Ceremony speech by Karl Ragnar Gierow nobelprize.org
Press release nobelprize.org
Nobel diploma nobelprize.org

1972
Heinrich Böll